Linda Geeves (born 21 June 1954) is a British former professional tennis player.

Geeves was active on tour in the 1970s and 1980s. She featured as a wildcard in the singles main draw of the 1980 Wimbledon Championships and lost her first round match in three sets to Betty Ann Dent.

References

External links
 
 

1954 births
Living people
British female tennis players
20th-century British women